Massimo Wertmüller (born 13 August 1956) is an Italian actor. He appeared in more than sixty films since 1978.

Filmography

Films

Television

References

External links 

1956 births
Living people
Italian male film actors